La Estancia is a small Caserio (town) part of the Texistepeque municipality in the Santa Ana department located 85.7 Kilometers (53.25 miles) from El Salvador's capital San Salvador.

References 

Populated places in El Salvador
Santa Ana Department